Sister Joyce Rupp, O.S.M., is a Roman Catholic author and speaker. She is the co-director of The Institute of Compassionate Presence, a member of the Servite Order, and a volunteer for Hospice. Joyce has a Bachelor of Arts degree in English, a Master of Arts degree in Transpersonal Psychology, and a Master of Religious Education degree. She lives in Des Moines, Iowa.

Education
 BA in Elementary Education from Duchesne College in Omaha, Nebraska. 1965
 MRE from University of St. Thomas in Houston, Texas. 1975
 Studies in spirituality at Creighton University and the University of Notre Dame
 MTP from the Institute of Transpersonal Psychology, Palo Alto, California. 1993
 Studies in Jungian psychology at Naropa University in Boulder, Colorado, 1992–1994

Biography
Joyce Rupp was born on June 8, 1943, and grew up on a farm in Iowa.

In 1962 she joined a religious Order known as the Servites or Servants of Mary and is a facilitator of the community’s ongoing spiritual growth program.

As part of her work as vocation director for the Archdiocese of Omaha, she began leading retreats for high school and college-age students in 1973. Several years later she started to lead retreats for adults.  Since then, she has traveled extensively, and her international retreats and conferences have taken her to Canada, Europe, New Zealand, Africa, Australia, and Asia.

In 1965 she received a BA in Elementary Education from Duchesne College in Omaha, Nebraska, and in 1975 she received her MRE from University of St. Thomas in Houston, Texas. After completing studies in spirituality at Creighton University and the University of Notre Dame, she earned a MTP from the Institute of Transpersonal Psychology, Palo Alto, California in 1993. She also studied Jungian psychology at Naropa University in Boulder, Colorado, from 1992 to 1994.

Rupp has become an author of popular books that have been translated into seven languages. Walk in a Relaxed Manner: Life Lessons on the Camino (Orbis, 2005) and The Circle of Life (Sorin Books, 2005) received first and second place awards, respectively, from The Catholic Press Association in 2006. The Circle of Life also received an award for "One of the Best Spiritual Books of 2005" from Spirituality & Practice. One of Rupp’s most recent books, Open the Door (Sorin Books), was published in September 2008 and received the Best 2008 Spiritual Books award from Spirituality & Practice. Her best-selling book, Praying Our Goodbyes (Sorin Books, 1988), was reissued in 2009.

In 2004, Rupp received the U.S. Catholic Award for Furthering the Cause of Women in the Church for her significant role as a “midwife” for women’s spirituality. She has also been a volunteer for hospice for 15 years.

In 2008, along with Margaret Stratman, Rupp became a co-director of a new program called The Institute of Compassionate Presence. This innovative venture seeks to coach participants to bring to life their own innate compassion.

In 2018, Rupp wrote Boundless Compassion which was awarded an award from the Catholic Press Association and the Association of Catholic Publishers.

References

External links
 Official Website
 
 The Institute of Compassionate Presence
  Best Spiritual Books of 2008 Award link (Open the Door)
  Interview about May I Have This Dance? with Frederic Brussat.

1943 births
American religious writers
Women religious writers
Living people
Roman Catholic writers
Servite tertiaries
Duchesne College (Nebraska) alumni
St. Thomas University (Florida) alumni
20th-century American Roman Catholic nuns
21st-century American Roman Catholic nuns